Oliver Perry may refer to:

Oliver Hazard Perry (1785–1819), American naval commander
Oliver Henry Perry (1815–1882), American politician

See also
Oliver Perry Hay (1846–1930), American paleontologist
Oliver Perry Temple (1820–1907), American attorney
Oliver Perry-Smith (1884–1969), American mountaineer